Glyphidoptera polymita is a species of moth of the family Tortricidae. It is found in Australia, where it has been recorded from New South Wales.

The wingspan is about 22 mm. The forewings are whitish, suffused and streaked with reddish brown. The hindwings are grey whitish.

References

Moths described in 1916
Archipini